Iowa Workforce Development is a government agency in the American state of Iowa, responsible for overseeing workplace safety, workers' compensation, unemployment insurance and job training services. It was formed in May 1996.

Divisions
The agency consists of six divisions.

Labor Services Division
 Enforces safety in the workplace
 Provides consultation to employers on occupational safety health compliance
 Conducts amusement ride, elevator and boiler inspections
 Maintains statistical information of workers' illness and injuries
 Enforces wage, labor and child laws

The Division of Labor Services is responsible for the enforcement of programs designed to protect the safety, health and economic security of all Iowans.

Workers' Compensation
 Oversee medical and wage replacement benefits to workers for injuries on the job, occupational diseases or hearing loss
 Conducts workers' compensation mediations and hearings

The Workers’ Compensation Act is a part of the Iowa Code designed to provide certain benefits to employees who receive injury (85), occupational disease (85A) or occupational hearing loss (85B) arising out of and during the course of their employment. Benefits are payable regardless of fault and are the exclusive remedy of the employee against the employer.

Unemployment Insurance

 Collects unemployment insurance taxes
 Maintains Iowa Unemployment Trust Fund
 Makes payments to eligible jobless workers

Division of Administrative Services
The Division of Administrative Services provides administrative support functions for the department, including employee services, building/premises management, office services, financial reporting and accounting.

Workforce Services
The Division of Workforce Services is responsible for the delivery of various state and federally funded employment and training services. Services are delivered through 15 regional one-stop centers and satellite offices.

The regional one-stop centers and offices provide a variety of services to meet the workforce and workplace needs of job seekers, dislocated workers, unemployed persons and Iowa businesses through partnerships of state and local service providers. They provide job counseling, job training, job placement and assistance to special needs populations.

Labor Market and Workforce 
The Labor Market and Workforce Information Division collects, analyzes and prepares a wide array of economic statistics and information that describes labor areas in terms of their economic trends, industries, occupations, wages and workers.

The Division also works in cooperation with the United States Department of Labor’s Bureau of Labor Statistics and the Employment and Training Administration; the United States Census Bureau, other researchers and community development experts to produce information that is comparable in methodology and products for the nation, state and sub state areas.  These products serve economic developers, employers, government, legislators, grant writers, Iowa Workforce Development staff and partners, job seekers, labor organizations, consultants, and academic institutions.

References

External links
 Iowa Workforce Development home page
 A Brief History of Iowa Workforce Development

Government of Iowa
State departments of labor of the United States